Tamara Dmitrevna Novichenko is a Russian soprano singer and Meritorious Artist. Novichenko is a graduate of Rimsky-Korsakov Leningrad State Conservatory. As of 1972 she is a professor at the Saint Petersburg Conservatory but only got this title in 1992. She performs in many Russian cities including: Petrozavodsk, Pskov, and Volgograd and also appears abroad in Stuttgart, Prague, Wroclaw, and Seoul. Throughout her life as a teacher she had graduated over 50 students including Elena Ustinova, Galina Shoidagbaeva, Elena Mirtova, Marina Shaguch, Anna Netrebko, Tatiana Pavlovskaya, and Irina Matayeva.

References

Living people
20th-century births
Russian sopranos
20th-century Russian women opera singers
Soviet women opera singers
Honored Artists of the Russian Federation
Year of birth missing (living people)